The CONCACAF Champions League, known officially as the Scotiabank CONCACAF Champions League for sponsorship reasons, is an annual continental club football competition organized by CONCACAF. The tournament is contested by clubs from North America, Central America, and the Caribbean. The winner of the CONCACAF Champions League automatically qualifies for the quarter-finals of the FIFA Club World Cup.

The tournament currently uses a knockout format; it had a group stage prior to the 2018 competition. Unlike its European and South American counterparts, the winner of the CONCACAF Champions League does not automatically qualify for the following season's competition.

When it was first organized in 1962, the competition was called the CONCACAF Champions' Cup. The title has been won by 28 clubs, 13 of which have won the title more than once. Mexican clubs have accumulated the highest number of victories, with 36 titles in total. The second most successful league has been Costa Rica's Primera División, with six titles in total. Mexican side América are the most successful club in the competition's history, with seven titles, followed by fellow Mexican side Cruz Azul with six titles. The most successful non-Mexican club is Saprissa of Costa Rica, with three titles. The only four teams to successfully defend the trophy are all Mexican: América, Cruz Azul, Pachuca and Monterrey. The current champions of the competition are Seattle Sounders FC, who defeated UNAM in the 2022 final.

Competition format 
The tournament employs a 16-team knockout format and is played between February and May. Ten teams qualify automatically based on domestic performance, along with the top six teams (champion, runner-up, two losing semi-finalists, and two best losing quarter-finalists) of the CONCACAF League, played at the end of the previous calendar year.

Each round of competition consists of a two-leg home-and-away series with the winner determined by aggregate goals over both legs. If aggregate goals are equal, the away goals rule is applied. If away goals are also equal, the game is decided by an immediate penalty shoot-out; there are no overtime periods.

Prior to 2018, the tournament had two parts: a group stage held from August to October, and a knockout phase held from March to May of the following year. The group stage consisted of 24 teams playing in eight groups of three teams each, with each team playing the other two teams in its group twice. United States and Mexican sides could not be drawn into the same group. The winners of each of the eight groups advanced to the quarterfinals. Each phase of the knockout rounds (quarterfinals, semifinals, finals) consisted of a two-leg home-and-away series with the winner determined by aggregate goal differential. Seeding in the knockout phase was determined by performance during the group stage.

Prior to the 2012–13 season, the competition had involved four groups of four, with one Mexican team and one U.S. team in each group. A preliminary round was used to reduce the number of teams from 24 to 16.

History 

The competition was initially created as a possible measure to enter the South American Copa Libertadores, a competition organized by CONMEBOL.
Prior to 2008, the tournament was officially called the "CONCACAF Champions' Cup", but was usually referred to simply as the "Champions' Cup". The competition has had several different formats over its lifetime. From 1962 until 1995, the finalists, or clubs participating in a final round, would be decided by clubs who qualify via two separate brackets: a Caribbean Island qualifier and a Northern/Central American qualification competition. Initially, only the champions of the North American leagues participated. In 1971, the runners-up of a few North American leagues began to join and the tournament began to be expanded, incorporating round-robin group phases and more teams. After the creation of the United States' Major League Soccer, the competition became a straight knockout competition from 1997 until it was revamped into a tournament with a group stage in 2008.

Champions' Cup Era (1962–2008) 
The competition's first edition, a knockout tournament called the Champions' Cup, was played under a variety of formats.  The last format, used from 2004 to 2008, had eight teams competing – four from the North American zone (two from Mexico, two from the United States), three from the Central American zone, and one from the Caribbean zone. Since 2005, the champion of the competition also gained entry into the FIFA Club World Cup, giving clubs an added incentive for a strong participation and greater interest from fans. Also, the Champions' Cup Runner-up would be one of the three CONCACAF invitees to the Copa Sudamericana.

Champions League Era (2008–2017) 
The CONCACAF Executive Committee at their 2006 November meeting decided to "act upon" a proposal—first delineated in 2003 by then Head of Special Projects Mel Brennan—at their next meeting by the CONCACAF Secretariat to develop the CONCACAF Champions’ Cup into a larger "Champions League" style event. The CONCACAF Executive Committee reported on 14 November 2007 some of the details.

The previous Champions' Cup format was used as planned in March and April 2008.  Then, a newly expanded Champions League tournament was conducted starting in August 2008 and concluding in May 2009.  The initial setup involved 24 teams and featured a Preliminary Round contested by 16 teams to reduce the field to 16 teams, which were separated into four groups of four teams. After the Group Stage, the Championship Round are held from the Quarterfinal Round onward.

Since 2012, the 24 teams have been divided into eight groups of three teams.  The first placed teams qualify for the quarter finals.  The quarter finals, semi finals and final are played over two legs.

Tournament restructuring (2018–2023) 
In December 2016, Manuel Quintanilla, president of the Nicaraguan Football Federation, spoke of a possible new format for the competition, a statement that was later corroborated by Garth Lagerwey, the general manager of Seattle Sounders FC. On 23 January 2017, CONCACAF confirmed the new format beginning with the 2018 edition, eliminating the group stage which had been employed since the re-branding of the competition to the CONCACAF Champions League in 2008.

Under the new CONCACAF competition platform, 31 clubs compete in CONCACAF competitions. 22 teams compete in a new tournament played from August to December, called the CONCACAF League. The CONCACAF League features 18 teams from Central America, three teams from the Caribbean and one team from North America. The champions and next best five clubs advance to the CONCACAF Champions League, played between February and May of the next calendar year, joining nine teams from North America and one team from the Caribbean (the champions of the Caribbean Club Championship).

Expansion (from 2024) 
In February 2021, CONCACAF announced a major overhaul of the tournament which would have included 50 teams and a regional group stage. Twenty teams from North America, twenty teams from Central America, and ten teams from the Caribbean would have been divided into groups of five teams where a total of 16 teams would advance to the knockout stage. This format was abandoned and was never used.

In September of that year, CONCACAF announced an expansion of the tournament to begin in 2024. Under the new format, twenty-seven teams would take part in the Champions League; twenty-two teams would enter the first round, 

 5 x Liga MX clubs
 4 x MLS clubs
 2 x Canadian Premier League clubs
 2 x Leagues Cup clubs (runner-up and third-place team)
 1 x U.S. Open Cup winner
 1 x Canadian Championship winner
 5 x Central America Cup clubs (runner-up, two losing semifinalists and two play-in winners)
 2 x Caribbean Cup (second-place and third-place finishers)

The winners will be joined by five teams in the round of 16, 

 MLS Cup winner
 Liga MX winner (Apertura or Clausura winner with higher aggregate table points)
 Leagues Cup winner
 Central American Cup winner
 Caribbean Cup winner

Teams may qualify for the CONCACAF Champions League through their domestic leagues or cups, or through their regional cup competitions: the Leagues Cup for teams from North America, the Central American Cup for teams from Central America, and a Caribbean Cup for teams from the Caribbean. All matches will include home and away series between the first round to the semi finals, with the Final being a single match at a neutral site

Qualification 
A total of sixteen teams participate in the CONCACAF Champions League: at least nine from the North American Zone (from three associations), and at least one team from the Caribbean Zone (the champions of the Caribbean Club Championship). The remaining six berths goes to the top-six placed teams in the CONCACAF League, played between eighteen teams from the Central American Zone, three from the Caribbean Zone and one from the North American Zone. At least two Central American Zone teams will qualify through the CONCACAF League.

Nine from the North American Zone:
Four clubs from 
Four clubs from the 
One club from 

One club from the Caribbean Zone:
One club, qualifying via the Caribbean Club Championship

Six clubs from the Central American, Caribbean, or North American Zones.
6 clubs, qualifying via the CONCACAF League

Clubs may be disqualified and replaced by a club from another association if the club does not have an available stadium that meets CONCACAF regulations for safety. If a club's own stadium fails to meet the set standards then it may find a suitable replacement stadium within its own country. However, if it is still determined that the club cannot provide the adequate facilities then it runs the risk of being replaced.

North American Zone 
Nine teams from the North American Football Union qualify to the Champions League. Mexico and the United States are each allocated four berths, the most of any of CONCACAF's member associations, while Canada is granted one berth in the tournament.

For Mexico, the winners and runners-up of the Liga MX Apertura and Clausura tournaments qualify for the Champions League.

For the United States, three berths are allocated through the Major League Soccer (MLS) regular season and playoffs (the MLS Cup winner, the Supporters' Shield winner, and the other regular season conference winner); the fourth berth is allocated to the winner of its domestic cup competition, the U.S. Open Cup. If a Canada-based team occupies any MLS-allocated berth, or any U.S-based team qualifies for the Champions League by more than one method, the Champions League place is allocated to the U.S.-based team with the best MLS regular season record which has failed to otherwise qualify.

The lone Canadian berth is awarded to the winner of the Canadian Championship, Canada's domestic cup competition. When Canada hosted the 2015 FIFA Women's World Cup, the Canadian Championship was moved from April–May to April–August (with no matches occurring between May and August), overlapping with the start of the Champions League. For the 2015–16 tournament only, the Canadian berth into the tournament was given to the best Canadian team in the MLS regular season.

Caribbean Zone 
One team from the Caribbean Football Union qualifies directly to the Champions League. This berth goes to the winners of the Caribbean Club Championship.

If the Caribbean qualifier is precluded, they are supplanted by the runners-up of the Caribbean Club Championship.

CONCACAF League 
The final six berths are awarded to the top-six placed teams in CONCACAF League. Twenty two teams participate in this tournament, eighteen from the Central American Zone (three berths each from Costa Rica, Honduras, Guatemala, Panama, and El Salvador; two from Nicaragua; and one from Belize), three from the Caribbean Zone (the runners-up and third place team from the Caribbean Club Championship, and the winners of a playoff between the fourth-place team and the Caribbean Club Shield winners), and one from Canada (the Canadian Premier League representative).

Stadium standards 
If a club fails to meet the standards for its home stadium, the club must find a suitable stadium in its own country, and if the club fails to provide the adequate facilities, it runs the risk of being replaced by another team. Real Esteli of Nicaragua failed stadium requirements and was replaced by another team for the 2009–10 and 2010–11 seasons. Estadio Independencia in Nicaragua has since been renovated, including upgrades to stadium lighting, and Nicaraguan teams now participate. The qualifying team from Belize failed stadium requirements and was replaced by another team in each season from 2009–10 through 2014–15.

On 8 April 2015, Mexican side Club América broke the all time CONCACAF Champions League match attendance record when a reported 66,208 spectators gathered at the Estadio Azteca in Mexico City to watch América play Costa Rican club Herediano in the second leg of the semifinals of the 2015 edition of the tournament. This was surpassed by the Seattle Sounders FC on 4 May 2022, at Lumen Field in the final against UNAM with an announced attendance of 68,741.

Prizes

Trophy and medals 
Each year, the winning team is presented with the CONCACAF Champion Clubs' Cup.

Prize money 
As of 2022, the fixed amount of prize money paid to participating clubs is as follows.

 Winner: $500,000
 Runner-up: $300,000 
 Semifinalists: $200,000

In addition, the CONCACAF Champions League winner represents the region at the FIFA Club World Cup, which includes additional prize money.

Sponsorship 
The CONCACAF Champions League has several corporate sponsors: Scotiabank (which has been a title sponsor of the Champions League since 2014–15), Miller Lite, MoneyGram, Maxxis Tires, and Nike. The sponsors' names appear on the boards around the perimeter of the field, and boards for pre-game and post-game interviews and press conferences. Nike is also the official provider of game balls and referee uniforms.

American Airlines was the title sponsor for the Champions' Cup in the 1990s.

Broadcasters 

The CONCACAF Champions League broadcast is also available in South America in all languages on ESPN (Star+) and globally in English through Concacaf GO.

Finals 

Since the inaugural edition of the CONCACAF Champions League, the finals have only ever been contested by clubs from Mexico, United States or Canada. The first 14 were won by Mexican clubs. The most recent final was contested by Seattle Sounders FC and UNAM, won by the former 5–2 on aggregate. The second leg at Seattle's Lumen Field was played in front of a tournament record crowd of 68,741.

Records and statistics

Champions League

Champions' Cup 

† – Title shared.
†† – Includes one title shared.
 When sorted by years won or lost, the table is sorted by the year of each team's most recent inaugural win or loss.

See also 

 FIFA Club World Cup
 CONCACAF Champions League U13
 CONCACAF Cup Winners' Cup
 CONCACAF Giants Cup
 CONCACAF League
 Continental football championships
 Interamerican Cup
 Leagues Cup
 North American SuperLiga
 List of association football competitions

References

External links 

 
 CONCACAF Club competitions of rsssf

 
Champions League
Multi-national association football leagues in North America
Sports leagues established in 1962
1962 establishments in North America